Mehman Azizov (born January 1, 1976) is an Azerbaijani former judoka.

He finished in joint fifth place in the half-middleweight (81 kg) division at the 2004 Summer Olympics, having lost the bronze medal match to Dmitri Nossov of Russia.

Achievements

References
 Yahoo! Sports

External links
 

1976 births
Living people
Azerbaijani male judoka
Judoka at the 2000 Summer Olympics
Judoka at the 2004 Summer Olympics
Judoka at the 2008 Summer Olympics
Olympic judoka of Azerbaijan
Universiade medalists in judo
Universiade silver medalists for Azerbaijan
20th-century Azerbaijani people
21st-century Azerbaijani people